Sport in Georgia has a long history.

The most popular sports in Georgia are football, basketball, rugby union, wrestling, judo and weightlifting. In 19th-century Georgia polo and the traditional Georgian game lelo were popular, later replaced by rugby union.

Wrestling
Wrestling remains a historically important sport. Some historians claim that the Greco-Roman style of wrestling incorporates many Georgian elements. Within Georgia, one of the most popularized styles of wrestling is the Kakhetian style. However, other styles are not as widely used today. For example, the Khevsureti region of Georgia has three different styles of wrestling.

Football

Football is one of the most popular sports in Georgia. It is governed by the Georgian Football Federation (GFF). The GFF organizes the men's, women's, and futsal national teams. Modern football was introduced by English sailors playing in Poti at the beginning of the 20th century.

Rugby union

Rugby union is one of the most popular team sports in the country. They have qualified in every single Rugby World Cup since 2003, their best result being winning two games at pool stage in the Rugby World Cup 2015. Their national team is considered to be Tier 2 with high performance.

Lelo burti

Lelo, or lelo burti (Georgian: ლელო ბურთი), literally a "field ball [playing]", is a Georgian folk sport. It is a full contact ball game, similar to rugby. Within Georgian rugby union terminology, the word lelo is used to mean a try, and the popularity of rugby union in Georgia has been attributed to it.

In 2014, lelo burti, along with khridoli, a traditional martial art, was inscribed by the government of Georgia as a "nonmaterial monument" of culture.

It appeared in the 12th century Georgian epic poem "The Knight in the Panther's Skin" in which the characters play lelo burti.

Basketball
Georgia has produced world-class basketball players including Tornike Shengelia, Vladimir Stepania, Nikoloz Tskitishvili and most notably Zaza Pachulia. Georgians strongly support their national team. Mikheil Saakashvili, former president of the country, travelled to Lithuania to support his team at the 2011 EuroBasket with 1,500 fans from Georgia.

Georgia co-hosted EuroBasket 2021 in Tbilisi alongside Czech Republic, Germany and Italy.

Tornike Shengelia is playing in Euroleague, they had wins against Serbia, Lithuania and Greece.

As of March 2021, Georgia's men ranked 36th in the world.

Weightlifting 
Weightlifting is a sport athletes compete in lifting a barbel with weight plates from the ground to overhead, with each athlete vying to succesessfully lift the heaviest weights.  (information is copied from this link weightlifting )

Motorsport
The only race circuit in the Caucasian region is located in Georgia. Rustavi International Motorpark was originally built in 1978 and re-opened in 2012 after reconstruction costing $20 million. The track satisfies FIA Grade 2 requirements and currently hosts the Legends car racing series and Formula Alfa competitions.

Winter sports

Luge
Nodar Kumaritashvili (Georgian: ნოდარ ქუმარიტაშვილი; 25 November 1988 – 12 February 2010) suffered a fatal crash during a training run prior to the 2010 Winter Olympics competition in Vancouver, Canada. He was the fourth athlete to die during Winter Olympics preparations in history, and the first in 18 years. The opening ceremonies of the Games, led by IOC President Jacques Rogge, which took place later on the fateful day, were dedicated to the 21-year-old.

See also
 Ministry of Sport & Youth Affairs of Georgia
 Sport in Abkhazia

References